"Kay" is a song written by Hank Mills and recorded by John Wesley Ryles. It was released in late 1968 by Columbia Records as Ryles' debut single. "Kay," recorded and released while Ryles was still a teenager, began a string of country music hits for him that would continue into the 1980s.

Content
"Kay" is about a taxicab driver in Nashville, Tennessee. He sold everything he owned to bring the woman he has loved and been with for years from Houston to Nashville, where she is becoming a star and moving beyond needing him. It is a song full of feelings and sadness.  The song describes some of the people that he carries. Among them are soldiers from Fort Campbell who tell him that they "hate that war in Vietnam". This line has been cited as an example of the anti-war movement's presence in country music in the late 1960s.

Chart performance
Ryles' original version of "Kay" spent 17 weeks on the Hot Country Songs charts, peaking at number 9. It also reached number 83 on the Billboard Hot 100. Ryles re-recorded it for ABC Records in 1978, including this version on his album Shine on Me.

Original version

Re-release

Other versions
Daryle Singletary covered the song as a duet with Ryles on his 2002 album That's Why I Sing This Way.

See also
List of anti-war songs

References

1968 debut singles
1978 singles
Columbia Records singles
John Wesley Ryles songs
Songs written by Hank Mills
ABC Records singles
1968 songs
Dot Records singles
Song recordings produced by George Richey
Songs about Tennessee
Songs about country music